Cedar Hill State Park is located on FM 1382 and the eastern shore of Joe Pool Lake in Cedar Hill, Texas (USA), ten miles southwest of Dallas. The park was acquired in 1982 and was opened in 1991. The Texas Parks and Wildlife Department operates the  park.

Cedar Hill State Park has two available camping areas, a boat ramp, a small picnic area, and two fishing jetties.

Features

Nature
The park lies at the intersection of two ecosystems: rolling tallgrass prairie and limestone escarpment. It features over 200 species of birds, as well as various mammals and fish in Joe Pool Lake. The area has over 4 miles of hiking trails in addition to the DORBA trails.

Penn Farm Agricultural History Center
The Penn Farm Agricultural History Center is located within the boundaries. The farm has reconstructed and historic buildings from the mid-19th century through the mid-20th century.

DORBA Mountain Bike Trail
Designed, built and maintained by the Dallas Off-Road Bike Association (DORBA), this trail is 12 miles long and consists of three concentric paths — 3 miles (Short), 8 miles (Middle), and 12 miles (Outer).

See also
List of Texas state parks

References

External links
Texas Parks & Wildlife - Cedar Hill State Park
another Cedar Hill State Park website
Joe Pool Lake

State parks of Texas
Museums in Dallas County, Texas
Open-air museums in Texas
Agriculture museums in the United States
Protected areas of Dallas County, Texas
Protected areas established in 1982
1982 establishments in Texas